The Municipality of Loški Potok is a municipality in southern Slovenia. It is part of the traditional region of Lower Carniola and is now included in the Southeast Slovenia Statistical Region. The municipal administration is based in the settlement of Hrib–Loški Potok. Traditionally forestry provided the main income for local inhabitants and it still plays an important role.

Name
The name Loški Potok was originally a hydronym, derived from the adjective form of log '(swampy) meadow' + potok 'stream', thus literally meaning 'stream in a (swampy) meadow'. This probably refers to the level area south of Travnik, where there is a creek with the same name. The name was attested in written sources as Laserbach, Loserbach, and Lasserbach in 1763–1787. In the past, the German equivalent of the name was Laserbach. The surrounding Potok Plateau is also named after Loški potok.

Settlements

In addition to the municipal seat of Hrib–Loški Potok, the municipality also includes the following settlements:

 Črni Potok pri Dragi
 Draga
 Glažuta
 Lazec
 Mali Log
 Novi Kot
 Podplanina
 Podpreska
 Pungert
 Retje
 Šegova Vas
 Srednja Vas pri Dragi
 Srednja Vas–Loški Potok
 Stari Kot
 Trava
 Travnik

References

External links

 Municipality of Loški Potok on Geopedia
Loški Potok municipal site

Loski Potok
1994 establishments in Slovenia